Werner Jaisli (8 November 1915 – 30 January 2010) was a Swiss racing cyclist. He rode in the 1939 Tour de France.

References

1915 births
2010 deaths
Swiss male cyclists
Place of birth missing